Yuri Viktorovich Nikitin (born 15 July 1978) is a Ukrainian gymnast and Olympic champion. He won a gold medal at the 2004 Summer Olympics in Athens.  He also competed at the 2008 and 2012 Summer Olympics.

References

External links
 
 
 
 

1978 births
Living people
Sportspeople from Kherson
Ukrainian male trampolinists
Gymnasts at the 2004 Summer Olympics
Gymnasts at the 2008 Summer Olympics
Gymnasts at the 2012 Summer Olympics
Olympic gold medalists for Ukraine
Olympic medalists in gymnastics
Medalists at the 2004 Summer Olympics
Competitors at the 2009 World Games